Aruna Shields is a British actress, filmmaker and therapist. She debuted with the 2010 Indian film Prince starring Vivek Oberoi.

Career
Shields, while at a theatrical workshop, was spotted by an acting agent. According to Google zeitgeist, in the year 2010, Aruna was the number one most sought-after actress in internet queries originating from India.

Shields has a wellbeing channel on YouTube called Aruna Shields TV, which began in 2015.

She studied Hypnosis and Psychotherapy at Masters level at the National Colleges in London and also trained in Mindfulness. Her earlier education includes a distinction from the Guildhall School of Music and Drama, a degree from Central Saint Martins, and an academic scholarship to Durham Boarding School.

She made her Bollywood debut in 2010 in the action thriller Prince, released on 9 April 2010. The same year, she played the female lead in the epic adventure Ao The Last Neanderthal, a love story set 30,000 years ago in a lost savage world. The film was produced by European cinema chain UGC.

Her film Mr. Singh Mrs. Mehta was released on 25 June 2010.

Aruna is also a dance choreographer and has experience as a belly dancer.

Filmography

Television

References

External links

 
 
 

Living people
1978 births
British film actresses
British television actresses
British actresses of Indian descent
Actresses in Hindi cinema
Actresses in Telugu cinema
British expatriate actresses in India
European actresses in India
21st-century British actresses